Trevor Bell may refer to:
Trevor Bell (artist) (1930–2017), English painter
Trevor Bell (baseball) (born 1986), American baseball pitcher